Remedies is the debut album by The Herbaliser, released on Ninja Tune in 1995.

Critical reception
Peter Shapiro, in Drum 'n' Bass: The Rough Guide, called it "awash in sticky jazz toffee and narcotic atmospheres."

Track listing
 "Intro" 2:23
 "Scratchy Noise" 7:18
 "Blomp" 0:46
 "Styles" 6:25
 "Interloodle" 1:36
 "Bust a Nut" 4:31
 "Herbalize It" 2:10
 "Real Killer Pt. 2" 5:37
 "Forty Winks" 3:06
 "A Little Groove" 3:46
 "Repetitive Loop (Re-Loop)" 5:57
 "Ka Boink!!" 2:01
 "Wrong Place" (featuring Fabian) 5:24
 "Da Trax" 1:38
 "Up 4 the Get Downs" 5:30
 "Outro" 0:14

Personnel
Ollie Teeba - DJ
Jake Wherry - bass

References 

The Herbaliser albums
Ninja Tune albums
1995 debut albums